Felix Jacob Marchand (22 October 1846 – 4 February 1928) was a German pathologist born in Halle an der Saale. 

He studied medicine in Berlin, and later became an assistant at the pathological institute in Halle. In 1881 he became a professor of pathological anatomy in Giessen, and two years later garnered the same position at Marburg. In 1900 he succeeded pathologist Felix Victor Birch-Hirschfeld (1842-1899) at the University of Leipzig.

In 1904 Marchand is credited with coining the term atherosclerosis from the Greek "athero", meaning gruel, and "sclerosis", meaning hardening, to describe the fatty substance inside a hardened artery. His name is lent to the eponymous "Marchand's adrenals", which is accessory adrenal tissue in the broad ligament of the uterus. 

Among his written works was a 4-volume textbook on pathology that he co-authored with Ludolf von Krehl (1861-1937), called "Handbuch der allgemeinen Pathologie".

References 
 "This article incorporates information based on a translation of an equivalent article at the German Wikipedia".
 Journal of the American College of Cardiology Evolving Concepts of Dyslipidemia, Atherosclerosis, and Cardiovascular Disease
 Felix Jacob Marchand at Who Named It

1846 births
1928 deaths
German pathologists
People from Halle (Saale)
People from the Province of Saxony
Humboldt University of Berlin alumni
Martin Luther University of Halle-Wittenberg alumni
Academic staff of the University of Breslau
Academic staff of the University of Giessen
Academic staff of the University of Marburg
Academic staff of Leipzig University